Sapieha Palace may refer to:

 Sapieha Palace, Lviv
 Sapieha Palace, Warsaw
 Sapieha Palace, Vilnius